A smatchet is a short, heavy fighting knife  in overall length (including grip). It was designed by William E. Fairbairn during World War II.

Design
Though described in the Office of Strategic Services catalogue as a cross between a machete and a bolo, it was actually based on the Royal Welch Fusiliers Trench Knife of World War I, and was designed as a pure combat knife.  It has a broad, leaf-shaped blade sharpened the full length on one side, and from the tip to half of the other side. The entire blade is coated with a dull matte finish to prevent detection at night from stray reflections.

Use
According to Fairbairn, the smatchet was an ideal close-combat weapon for those not armed with a rifle and bayonet:

The smatchet was used by British and American special forces (Special Air Service and Office of Strategic Services, respectively) during World War II.

In the late 1980s, Col. Rex Applegate licensed a modified version of the smatchet he and Fairbairn designed late in World War II. He called it the "Applegate-Fairbairn Combat Smatchet".

Manufacturers 
 United Cutlery
 Applegate-Fairbairn
 W.R. Case & Sons Cutlery Co.
 Cold Steel
 Wells Creek Knife & Gun Works
 Böker
 Windlass Steelcraft

See also
 Applegate–Fairbairn fighting knife
 BC-41
 Eric A. Sykes
 Fairbairn–Sykes fighting knife
 Kukri
 Pattern 1907 bayonet
 Barong (sword)

References

Further reading
 Fairbairn, W.E. (Lt. Col.), Get Tough!, 1942  (1999 reprint)

Machetes
Office of Strategic Services
World War II infantry weapons